Chimrawas village located in Tehsil Chitalwana in Jalore district of Rajasthan, India.
Chimrawas is located 33 km distance from Sanchore main town. It is 300 km from Jodhpur city. Near by village of this village with distance are Dungari (6 km), Keriya (15 km), National Highway 15(25). The majority of the population are Bishnoi. The main business of the villagers are milk production and agriculture.

Political 
Current Surpanch: Ashok Kumar khod

MLA : Sukhram Bishnoi

MP: Devji M Patel

Gram Seva Sahkari Sanghthan 
Current President: Chhoga Ram Bishnoi

Education 

Education institute in this village are followings:- 
 Govt. School  secondary
 Sarswati Vidya Mandir (Upper Primary)

Educational Institutes near by this village 
Indira College Lalji Ki Dungari (6 km)
College Sanchore (33 km)
Senior Secondary School, Dungari(6 km)
Senior Secondary School, Sesawa(6 km)

Crops 
The farmers are cropping many type of crops.
bajra (Pennisetum glaucum) :- bajra is the most widely grown type of millet.
bajra is the main food of this village
Jeera (Cuminum cyminum):- Jeera

Villages in Jalore district